Tomáš Strnad (born 8 December 1980) is a retired Czech football midfielder who last played for FC Hradec Králové.

References

External links
 at fksenica.sk 

1980 births
Living people
Czech footballers
Association football midfielders
Bohemians 1905 players
SK Kladno players
FK Dukla Banská Bystrica players
FK Senica players
FC Hradec Králové players
Czech First League players
Slovak Super Liga players
Expatriate footballers in Slovakia